Hyperolius raveni is a species of frog in the family Hyperoliidae.
Its natural habitats are rivers, freshwater marshes, and intermittent freshwater marshes.

References

raveni
Amphibians described in 1931
Taxonomy articles created by Polbot

fr:Hyperolius raveni